Scopula trisinuata, the sinuous wave, is a moth of the family Geometridae. It is found in Angola, Ghana, Kenya, Malawi, South Africa and Zambia.

References

Moths described in 1897
trisinuata
Moths of Africa